Jason Arhndt (born October 15, 1971) is an American retired professional wrestler. He is best known for his appearances with the World Wrestling Federation (WWF) under the ring name Joey Abs as part of the Mean Street Posse. He also performed using the nickname Venom.

Professional wrestling career

Early career (1994–1999)
Arhndt began his career as a member of Matt and Jeff Hardy's Organization of Modern Extreme Grappling Arts (OMEGA) in Cameron, North Carolina. Arhndt also made some appearances as enhancement talent using his real name on WWF Monday Night Raw in 1994 and 1995. In 1996, he became the first victim to receive the Stunner from Stone Cold Steve Austin on an episode of Superstars. Later that year, teaming with Eddie Jackie, they scored an upset win against Steve Austin, pinning him after he was clotheslined by Davey Boy Smith. On August 2, 1997, he was defeated by Jeff Hardy to crown the first OMEGA New Frontiers Champion.

World Wrestling Federation (1999–2001)
In early 1999, he joined the WWF as Joey Abs. He made his WWF debut on the June 21, 1999 episode of Raw is War. He was a part of the Mean Street Posse, a heel stable, with Pete Gas and Rodney, clad in sweater vests, loafers, and dress pants. Although Gas and Rodney were childhood friends of Shane McMahon, Abs had a legitimate wrestling background. They started off as a group from Greenwich, Connecticut of about ten people in early 1999, but then as the year went on the stable whittled its way down to three members. The group was closely allied with McMahon, often helping him defend the WWE European Championship throughout early 1999. At WrestleMania 2000, each member won the WWF Hardcore Championship for a short while.

All three Posse members were briefly signed to the WWF developmental territory of Memphis Championship Wrestling (MCW). In MCW in June 2000, Abs won the MCW Southern Heavyweight Championship from Lord Steven Regal. He, however, lost the title to K-Krush on August 19. Abs was released from the WWF in early 2001 and retired in the same year.

Championships and accomplishments
Championship Wrestling Federation
CWF Heavyweight Championship (1 time)
Memphis Championship Wrestling
MCW Hardcore Championship (1 time)
MCW Southern Heavyweight Championship (2 times)
National Championship Wrestling
NCW Heavyweight Championship (2 times)
New Frontier Wrestling Association
NFWA Tag Team Championship (1 time) - with Matt Hardy
Organization of Modern Extreme Grappling Arts
OMEGA Heavyweight Championship (1 time)
Pro Wrestling Illustrated
PWI ranked him # 176 of the Top 500 singles wrestlers in the PWI 500 in 2000
World Wrestling Federation
WWF Hardcore Championship (1 time)
Other titles
OPW Heavyweight Championship (1 time)

References

External links

1971 births
American male professional wrestlers
Living people
People from Carthage, North Carolina
Professional wrestlers from North Carolina
WWF/WWE Hardcore Champions
20th-century professional wrestlers
21st-century professional wrestlers